Zhuji is a county-level city under the administration of the prefecture-level city of Shaoxing, in north-central Zhejiang province, China, located about  south of Hangzhou. It has  with a population of 1,218,072 inhabitants at the 2020 census even though the built-up (or metro) area is much smaller.

History
The region around Zhuji has been settled since Neolithic times and was the origin of the Wuyue culture. During the Spring and Autumn period, it was the birthplace of the legendary beauty Xi Shi. After the state of Yue was absorbed into the unification of China, Qin Shi Huang formally codified the boundaries of Zhuji as a county in 222 BC. This status remained intact until 1989, when the State Council reclassified Zhuji as a city.

Administrative divisions
Subdistricts:
Jiyang Subdistrict (暨阳街道), Huandong Subdistrict (浣东街道), Taozhu Subdistrict (陶朱街道)

Towns:
Datang (大唐镇), Ciwu (次坞镇), Diankou (店口镇), Ruanshi (阮市镇), Jiangzao (江藻镇), Fengqiao (枫桥镇), Zhaojia (赵家镇), Majian (马剑镇), Caota (草塔镇), Paitou (牌头镇), Tongshan (同山镇), Anhua (安华镇), Jieting (街亭镇), Huangshan (璜山镇), Lipu (浬浦镇), Zhibu (直埠镇), Wuxie (五泄镇), Lingbei (岭北镇), Chenzhai (陈宅镇), Wangjiajing (王家井镇), Yingdianjie (应店街镇), Shanxiahu (山下湖镇), Dongbaihu (东白湖镇)

The only township is Donghe Township (东和乡)

Transport

China Railway
It is served by Zhuji railway station.

Hangzhou to Zhuji
Hangzhou–Zhuji intercity railway is currently under planning. It will be connect to Line 18 of Hangzhou Metro.
Stations

Shaoxing to Zhuji
Line S2 of Shaoxing Rail Transit (Shaoxing–Zhuji) is also under planning.

Climate

Economy
Zhuji is located in the Yangtze River Delta Economic Zone. Although there is not much arable land per capita, relying on the rich water resources of the Puyang River, it has developed agriculture well since ancient time. During the period of the Republic of China, many people in Zhuji, like other Zhejiang people in the surrounding areas, left their hometowns to develop in Shanghai, and operated small workshops, small factories, and textile and nanny jobs. After the reform and opening up, we vigorously developed townships, home-based industries, and made considerable achievements in textile and hardware manufacturing. At the same time, the two natural and cultural hotspots of Xi Shi and Wu Xie are used to develop the tourism industry.
Its modern civic strengths include an excellent educational system and robust economic development, especially in the production of pearls, socks and embroidery machinery  Datang. Due to its pearl production, the city has become known as "The Pearl City".
Apart from Pearl, it also has many other local specialties:
The textile industry is well developed. It has the largest hosiery industry in the country.
Small hardware industry. Spring, small and medium-sized bearings.
Rich in freshwater pearls, it has the largest pearl trading market in China and is known as the hometown of pearls.
Citron is also a local specialty tea.

Gallery

References

External links 

 Official Portal of Zhuji City
 Club of Zhuji City

 
County-level cities in Zhejiang
Shaoxing